Olympia Bonaparte, Princess Napoléon (Olympia Elene Marie; née Countess Olympia von und zu Arco-Zinneberg, born 4 January 1988), is the consort of Jean-Christophe, Prince Napoléon, the disputed head of the House of Bonaparte and, in the view of Bonapartists, the pretender to the abolished French imperial throne.

Early life and family 
Countess Olympia von und zu Arco-Zinneberg was born on 4 January 1988 in Munich to Count Riprand von und zu Arco-Zinneberg (1955-2021) and Archduchess Maria Beatrice of Austria-Este. Through her father she is a great-great-granddaughter of Ludwig III and Maria Theresa of Austria-Este, the last king and queen of Bavaria. Through her mother she is the granddaughter of Robert, Archduke of Austria-Este and Princess Margherita of Savoy-Aosta. She is a great-granddaughter of Charles I and Zita of Bourbon-Parma, the last emperor and empress of Austria. Olympia is also the great-great-great-great-grandniece of Marie Louise, Duchess of Parma, the second wife of Napoleon I.

Personal life 
Olympia graduated from Yale University with a degree in political science. She met Jean-Christophe, Prince Napoléon during a semester studying abroad in Paris. They became engaged in May 2019. Her engagement ring includes a diamond from the tiara of Eugénie de Montijo, the last Empress of the French and wife of Napoleon III.

Olympia and Jean-Christophe married on 17 October 2019 in a civil ceremony at the town hall of Neuilly-sur-Seine. A Catholic ceremony, celebrated by Antoine de Romanet, was held on 19 October 2019 at the Cathedral of Saint-Louis des Invalides, followed by a reception at the Château de Fontainebleau. The wedding festivities were attended by members of European royal and noble families including Henri, Grand Duke of Luxembourg; Guillaume, Hereditary Grand Duke of Luxembourg; Stéphanie, Hereditary Grand Duchess of Luxembourg; Princess Maria Laura of Belgium, Archduchess of Austria-Este; Pavlos, Crown Prince of Greece; Princess Maria-Olympia of Greece and Denmark; Prince Philippos of Greece and Denmark; Nina Flohr; Prince Félix of Luxembourg; Princess Claire of Luxembourg; Prince Christian of Hanover; Princess Christian of Hanover; Princess Beatrice of York; and Edoardo Mapelli Mozzi. Their wedding marked the first time in over two hundred years that a marriage between the House of Habsburg and the House of Bonaparte had taken place.

The Princess gave birth to a son, Louis Charles Riprand Victor Jérôme Marie, on 7 December 2022 in Paris.

Ancestry

References 

1988 births
20th-century Austrian women
21st-century Austrian women
20th-century German women
21st-century German women
Living people
Austrian countesses
House of Arco
Nobility from Munich
Princesses by marriage
Princesses Napoléon
Yale University alumni